Bulat Damirovich Khayernasov (born 30 September 1994) is a Russian football defender.

Club career
He made his debut in the Russian Second Division for FC Gornyak Uchaly on 21 July 2012 in a game against FC Syzran-2003.

He made his Russian Football National League debut for FC Ufa on 18 August 2013 in a game against FC Mordovia Saransk.

References

External links
 
 
 

1994 births
Footballers from Ufa
Living people
Russian footballers
Association football defenders
FC Gornyak Uchaly players
FC Ufa players
FC Vityaz Podolsk players